"Turn da Lights Off" is a song by American singer Tweet from her second studio album, It's Me Again (2005). It features guest vocals from American rapper Missy Elliott, who co-wrote and co-produced the song with Kwamé. The song was released on October 5, 2004, as the album's lead single. "Turn da Lights Off" contains a sample of Nat King Cole's "Lost April" and portions of Marvin Gaye and Tammi Terrell's "If This World Were Mine".

Background
Proposals for the It's Me Again lead single dates back to early 2004, where MTV reported that the Missy Elliott-produced "Shook Up", featuring rapper and former 106 & Park co-host Free, was in consideration for a lead single choice. However, complications from the merging between Elektra Records and Atlantic prevented the song's release, resulting in the song's cancellation and a pushback date for Tweet's It's Me Again album. On October 5, 2004, "Turn da Lights Off" was released and began to appear on numerous mixtapes to help spread the word of the song's release. A promotional remix featuring 50 Cent and an alternate line by Elliott was also released to mixtapes in order to generate further buzz for the single.

Critical reception
The song met generally mixed to favorable reviews. Shaheem Reid of MTV's Mixtape Monday complimented the track for its guest production by rapper Kwamé. Reid also praised Missy Elliott for her vocals and opening line, "we gonna take it back like polka dots", for its reminiscent-throwback feel of "a fly era".

By contrast, Andy Kellman of AllMusic criticized Elliott's vocals, stating that her "berserk squawks vandalize[d]" Tweet's "return single". On a lighter note, Kellman did favor Elliott's production for the single, in which he felt it was reminiscent of her other produced-single, "So Gone" by Monica. Kellman had also listed "Turn da Lights Off" as a "Song Pick", where it was cited as the "most representative" of the It's Me Again album.

Music video
The music video for "Turn da Lights Off", alongside a "Makes a Video" special, premiered on MTV2 on January 11, 2005 and was directed by Antti J. The video begins with Elliott portraying a DJ while scratching on a vinyl record and performing her adlibs. The video then cuts to Tweet posing for camera shots in construction for her It's Me Again album booklet. Throughout the video, Tweet is either seen getting a makeover or posing for other various camera shots. Elliott is shown again, where she begins to perform her rap while sitting on a couch behind Tweet's photo shoot or reprising her role as the DJ. The video then cuts back to Tweet posing for more camera shots while lip-syncing to the song.

Track listings
 US 12-inch single
A1. "Turn da Lights Off" (radio edit) – 4:15
A2. "Turn da Lights Off" (instrumental) – 5:13
B1. "Turn da Lights Off" (album version) – 4:55
B2. "Turn da Lights Off" (acapella) – 4:42

 UK CD single
 "Turn da Lights Off" (radio edit) – 3:39
 "Boogie 2nite" (Seamus Haji Boogie Mix) – 5:51

 German CD maxi single
 "Turn da Lights Off" (radio edit) – 4:14
 "Boogie 2nite" (Seamus Haji Boogie Mix) – 5:51
 "Turn da Lights Off" (remix) – 3:27

 UK and German 12-inch single
A1. "Turn da Lights Off" (album version) (featuring Missy Elliott) – 4:55
A2. "Turn da Lights Off" (remix) – 3:27
B1. "Turn da Lights Off" (instrumental) – 5:13
B2. "Boogie 2nite" (Seamus Haji Boogie Mix) – 5:51

Credits and personnel
Credits adapted from the liner notes of It's Me Again.

 Tweet – vocals
 Marcella Araica – assistant tracking engineering
 Carlos Bedoya – additional recording
 Jimmy Douglass – mixing
 Missy Elliott – production, songwriting, vocals
 Kwamé "K1Mil" – production, songwriting
 Patrick Magee – mixing assistance
 Herb Powers, Jr. – mastering
 Mike Rivera – recording

Charts

Release history

References

2004 singles
2004 songs
Atlantic Records singles
Missy Elliott songs
Song recordings produced by Kwamé
Songs written by Kwamé
Songs written by Marvin Gaye
Songs written by Missy Elliott
Songs written by Tweet (singer)
Tweet (singer) songs